Dichroplus is a genus of spur-throated grasshoppers in the family Acrididae. There are more than 20 described species in Dichroplus, found in North, Central, and South America.

Species
These species belong to the genus Dichroplus:

 Dichroplus alejomesai Liebermann, 1967
 Dichroplus bruneri Liebermann, 1965
 Dichroplus cinereus Bruner, 1900
 Dichroplus conspersus Bruner, 1900
 Dichroplus democraticus (Blanchard, 1851)
 Dichroplus elongatus Giglio-Tos, 1894
 Dichroplus exilis Giglio-Tos, 1894
 Dichroplus fuscus (Thunberg, 1815)
 Dichroplus intermedius Ronderos, 1976
 Dichroplus maculipennis (Blanchard, 1851)
 Dichroplus mantiqueirae Ronderos, Carbonell & Mesa, 1968
 Dichroplus misionensis Carbonell, 1968
 Dichroplus notatus Bruner, L., 1908 (Mexican dichroplus)
 Dichroplus obscurus Bruner, 1900
 Dichroplus paraelongatus Carbonell, 1968
 Dichroplus patruelis (Stål, 1861)
 Dichroplus porteri Liebermann, 1943
 Dichroplus pratensis Bruner, 1900
 Dichroplus robustulus (Stål, 1878)
 Dichroplus schulzi Bruner, 1906
 Dichroplus silveiraguidoi Liebermann, 1956
 Dichroplus vittatus Bruner, 1900
 Dichroplus vittigerum (Blanchard, 1851)

References

External links

 

Acrididae